List of Grand Slam champions can refer to:

 List of Grand Slam men's singles champions
 List of Grand Slam women's singles champions
 List of Grand Slam men's doubles champions
 List of Grand Slam women's doubles champions
 List of Grand Slam mixed doubles champions